Mike Hendricks (born 12 December 1942) is an Australian cricketer. He played forty-one first-class and nine List A matches for New South Wales and South Australia between 1969/70 and 1974/75.

See also
 List of New South Wales representative cricketers
 List of South Australian representative cricketers

References

External links
 

1942 births
Living people
Australian cricketers
Cricketers from Wollongong
New South Wales cricketers
South Australia cricketers